The Henderson News is a semi-weekly newspaper published in Henderson, Texas, on Wednesday afternoons and Sunday mornings. It is owned by Hartman Newspapers, Inc. based in Rosenberg, Texas.

Formed October 6, 1930, the day after the discovery of the East Texas Oil Field, the paper has a daily circulation of 7,206. On June 2, 2011 the company expanded with a special weekly paper called the Overton News to serve the nearby communities of Overton and New London after the closing of the Overton Press.

Each year The Henderson News receives numerous honors and awards from the Texas Press Association and the Northeast Texas Press Association, with previous Managing Editor Matthew Prosser receiving first place for news writing from the TPA and being named Journalist of the Year from the NETPA in 2012 and current Senior Reporter, Amber Lollar, receiving First Place in Column Writing from NEPTA for 2020.

Current Staff
Publisher: Dan Moore
Managing Editor: Amber Lollar
Sports Writer: Audrey Blasche
Office Manager: Nancy Harris
Graphic Artist: Katy Mirtz-Myers
Circulation Manager: Amanda McFadin
Press Room: Wes Beall

References

External links
 The Henderson News website

Newspapers published in Texas
Rusk County, Texas